Ude-Hishigi-Waki-Gatame is an armlock and one of the official 29 grappling techniques of Kodokan Judo. It is one of the nine joint techniques of the Kansetsu-waza list, one of the three grappling lists in Judo's Katame-waza enumerating 29 grappling techniques. Falling directly to the mat while applying or attempting to apply the Waki gatame in competition is listed as an Hansoku-make (Grave Infringement) by the International Judo Federation.

It is known as Fujiwara armbar in professional wrestling.

Technique description 
This armlock is executed with Uke on their stomach, while tori has uke's arm trapped with the elbow beneath tori's armpit. Tori lifts uke's hand, causing hyperextension of the elbow joint in a similar manner to Ude-Hishigi-Juji-Gatame.

Variants 
Kan'nuki gatame (閂固) (Single overhook)
Inside shoulder armlock

In mixed martial arts
The move was successfully used in mixed martial arts by Shinya Aoki in his debut on Shooto on January 25, 2005. He applied it on Keith Wisniewski during a clinch exchange, breaking his arm.

Included systems 
Systems:
Kodokan Judo, List of Kodokan Judo techniques
Lists:
The Canon Of Judo
Judo technique
The video, The Essence of Judo featuring Kyuzo Mifune
Tai gatame ude kujiki (1st pattern, 2nd pattern) (体固腕挫 その一,その二)

Similar techniques, variants, and aliases

IJF official names 
Ude-hishigi-waki-gatame (腕挫腋固)
U.H. waki-gatame
Waki-gatame (腋固)
WAK

Alias
Armpit Armlock
Body armlock (Ude-hishigi-tai-gatame)
Fujiwara armbar
Tai gatame ude kujiki

Similar techniques
Ude-Hishigi-Kata-Osae-Tai-Gatame and variant Ude-Hishigi-Tai-Gatame are described in The Canon Of Judo.
Kata osae tai gatame ude kujiki
Kata osae tai gatame ude kujiki is a joint hold demonstrated in The Essence Of Judo featuring Kyuzo Mifune. This is included in Ude hishigi hara gatame.

External links
Judo-ch.jp/english - Encyclopedic entry on technique
Suginoharyu.com - Example video

References

Judo technique